The  Barbarigo were a patrician, noble Venetian family, whose members had an important role in the history of the Republic of Venice.

History

The family originated from the Istrian area (according to the tradition, their ancestral place was Muggia, near Trieste). Also according to the family legend, in 880 AD one Arrigo won a battle against Saracen pirates and returned victoriously home with the beards ("barba" in Italian) of the defeated enemies, thus originating the family name - Barbarigo - and the coat of arms, representing six beards.

The Barbarigo were among the most influential Venetian families and have generated bishops, cardinals and patriarchs, including Gregorio Barbarigo, who was born in the Palazzo Barbarigo Minotto in 1625. The Barbarigo founded in 955 the first church of Santa Maria del Giglio, known as Santa Maria Zobenigo at the time.

The family remained part of the Venetian patricians after the Serrata del Maggior Consiglio in 1297.

Two members of the family became doges of Venice. The first, Marco, ruled the Republic in 1485-86 and was the first Doge to be crowned on the Giants Staircase of Palazzo Ducale. His reign was so short due to a fatal wrangle he had during a senate meeting with his brother and successor, Agostino. Agostino Barbarigo reigned from 1486 until 1501, the period in which Catherine Cornaro, queen of Cyprus, donated her kingdom to Venice. He introduced the habit of kissing the Doge's hand.

The Barbarigo family died out in 1843, with Giovanni Filippo Barbarigo, who died childless.

Prominent members
 Angelo Barbarigo (1350–1418), bishop and cardinal of Verona.
 Marco Barbarigo di Croia (fl. 1388–d. 1428), governor of Croia
 Marco Barbarigo (1413–1486), Doge of Venice.
 Agostino Barbarigo (1419–1501), brother of Marco, succeeded him as Doge.
 Agostino Barbarigo (1516–1571), captain general and head during the battle of Lepanto.
 St. Gregorio Barbarigo (1625–1697), cardinal and Saint.
 Marcantonio Barbarigo (1640–1706), cardinal.
 Giovanni Francesco Barbarigo (1658–1730), cardinal and nephew of Gregorio.

Houses

 Palazzo Barbarigo 
 Palazzo Barbarigo Minotto
 Palazzo Barbarigo Nani Mocenigo
 Palazzo Barbarigo della Terrazza
- all these are on the Grand Canal of Venice
 Villa Barbarigo, Galzignano Terme, near Padua.
 Villa Barbarigo, Noventa Vicentina, near Vicenza.

Sources

 
Republic of Venice families